Marc Hussey (born January 22, 1974) is a Canadian former professional ice hockey defenceman who was drafted by the Pittsburgh Penguins in the 1992 NHL Entry Draft 43rd overall.

Career
Born in Chatham, New Brunswick, Hussey played in the AHL and IHL from 1994 until 1999 and continued his career in Europe until his retirement in 2004. After his retirement, he became a head coach for the Saint John Vito's AAA hockey team in 2008. He held the position for two seasons before joining the QMJHL's Saint John Sea Dogs as an assistant coach in 2009. While coaching, he was also a member of the Saint John Police Force.

Career statistics

Awards and accomplishments
2011-12: QMJHL Champion (Saint John Sea Dogs, assistant coach)
2010-11: QMJHL Champion (Saint John Sea Dogs, assistant coach)
2010-11: Memorial Cup winner (Saint John Sea Dogs, assistant coach)

References

External links

1974 births
HC Alleghe players
Canadian ice hockey defencemen
Essen Mosquitoes players
Fredericton Canadiens players
Grand Rapids Griffins (IHL) players
Ice hockey people from New Brunswick
Indianapolis Ice players
Krefeld Pinguine players
Living people
London Knights (UK) players
Medicine Hat Tigers players
Milwaukee Admirals (IHL) players
Moose Jaw Warriors players
Nottingham Panthers players
People from Miramichi, New Brunswick
Pittsburgh Penguins draft picks
Saint John Flames players
St. John's Maple Leafs players
Tri-City Americans players
Utah Grizzlies (IHL) players